Fantasista may refer to:

 Fantasista (manga), Japanese manga series
 "Fantasista" (song), the tenth maxi single by Dragon Ash
 Fantasista Doll, a 2013 anime series
 Fantasista Utamaro, Japanese artist

See also
 Fantasia (disambiguation)
 Fantasist